Wedding Day (Italian: Giorno di nozze) is a 1942 Italian "white-telephones" comedy film directed by Raffaello Matarazzo and starring Armando Falconi, Amelia Chellini and Anna Proclemer.

It was shot at the Cinecitta Studios in Rome. The film's sets were designed by the art directors Gastone Medin and Gino Brosio.

Partial cast
 Armando Falconi as Mariano Bonotti  
 Amelia Chellini as Amalia - Mariano's wife  
 Anna Proclemer as Mariella Bonotti 
 Roberto Villa as Giorgio Birolli  
 Antonio Gandusio as Amedeo Birolli  
 Paola Borboni as Elena - Amedeo's wife  
 Chiaretta Gelli as Marisa Birolli - Amedeo's daughter

References

Bibliography 
 Gundle, Stephen. Mussolini's Dream Factory: Film Stardom in Fascist Italy. Berghahn Books, 2013.

External links 
 

1942 films
Italian comedy films
Italian black-and-white films
1942 comedy films
Films directed by Raffaello Matarazzo
Lux Film films
Films shot at Cinecittà Studios
1940s Italian films